Tipitina's Foundation  is a not-for-profit charity organization that grew out of the New Orleans music venue, Tipitina's. Based in New Orleans, Louisiana, the foundation's mission is to protect and preserve the musical culture of New Orleans and Louisiana. Following Hurricane Katrina, Tipitina's Foundation was particularly active. Part of the foundation's stated purpose is to empower the youth of the city to learn music. In order to encourage this, the foundation donates quality instruments to schools in the city and surrounding areas. The foundation also runs workshops teaching music performance at the club of the same name, Tipitina's, and operates a statewide network of technology access centers ("Tipitina's Music Office Co-Ops") to assist Louisiana's adult musicians and digital media professionals.

Fats Domino has dedicated proceeds from his latest musical release to the foundation. Actor Harry Shearer won $50,000 for the foundation on a recent edition of Celebrity Jeopardy!. Members of the foundation appeared on the Aaron Sorkin drama Studio 60 on the Sunset Strip in the episode "The Christmas Show."

The name is taken from the classic New Orleans piano tune, "Tipitina", written by Professor Longhair, also the name of a popular nightspot in New Orleans.

See also 
Tipitina's

References

External links 
 Tipitina's Foundation

Companies based in New Orleans
Hurricane Katrina recovery in New Orleans
Charities based in Louisiana
Music organizations based in the United States